Uruguay competed at the 2012 Summer Olympics in London, from 27 July to 12 August 2012. This was the nation's twentieth appearance at the Olympics, Uruguay missed the 1980 Summer Olympics in Moscow, because of its partial support for the United States boycott.

The Uruguayan Olympic Committee (COU) sent the nation's largest delegation to the Games since 1968. A total of 29 athletes, 26 men and 3 women, competed in 8 sports. Men's football was the only team-based sport in which Uruguay was represented at these Olympic games. There was only a single competitor in road cycling, judo and shooting.

Notable Uruguayan athletes included football stars Sebastián Coates and team captain Luis Suárez, who both had recently played for Liverpool F.C., siblings Alejandro and Andrea Foglia in men's and women's one-person dinghy sailing, and track hurdler Andrés Silva. Rower Rodolfo Collazo, who competed at his third Olympics along with Silva and the older Foglia, was the nation's flag bearer at the opening ceremony.

Uruguay, however, failed to win its first Olympic medal since the 2000 Summer Olympics in Sydney, where track cyclist Milton Wynants won silver in the points race (currently replaced by the omnium).

Athletics

Uruguay has qualified one athlete in the men's 400 m hurdles through the "A" standard qualification time and qualified one athlete in the women's 400 m hurdles:

Key
Note–Ranks given for track events are within the athlete's heat only
Q = Qualified for the next round
q = Qualified for the next round as a fastest loser or, in field events, by position without achieving the qualifying target
NR = National record
N/A = Round not applicable for the event
Bye = Athlete not required to compete in round

Men

Women

Cycling

Uruguay had qualified one cyclist in the men's road race through the UCI America tour.

Road

Football

Uruguay qualified a team in the men's tournament through the 2011 South American Youth Championship.

Men's tournament

Team roster

Group play

Judo

Uruguay had qualified one judoka in the men's middleweight (90 kg) class through additional places for the Americas.

Rowing

Uruguay had qualified one boat in the men's lightweight double sculls through the Latin America Continental Qualification Regatta.

Men

Qualification Legend: FA=Final A (medal); FB=Final B (non-medal); FC=Final C (non-medal); FD=Final D (non-medal); FE=Final E (non-medal); FF=Final F (non-medal); SA/B=Semifinals A/B; SC/D=Semifinals C/D; SE/F=Semifinals E/F; QF=Quarterfinals; R=Repechage

Sailing

Uruguay had qualified one boat each for the following events.

Men

Women

M = Medal race; EL = Eliminated – did not advance into the medal race;

Shooting

Uruguay had qualified one shooter in the men's 10 m air rifle.

Men

Swimming

Uruguay had qualified one swimmer in the men's 100 m freestyle through the Olympic selection time, and the other in the women's 100 m backstroke as a wildcard:

Men

Women

See also
Uruguay at the 2011 Pan American Games

References

External links 
 Uruguay – Olympic Movement

Nations at the 2012 Summer Olympics
2012
Summer Olympics